Tasmanogobius is a genus of gobies native to fresh, marine and brackish waters along the coasts of southern Australia and Tasmania.

Species
There are currently three recognized species in this genus:
 Tasmanogobius gloveri Hoese, 1991 (Marine goby)
 Tasmanogobius lasti Hoese, 1991 (Lagoon goby)
 Tasmanogobius lordi E. O. G. Scott, 1935 (Lord's goby)

References

Gobiidae